Mäkipää is a Finnish surname. Notable people with the surname include:

Tea Mäkipää (born 1973), Finnish artist
Tuomas Mäkipää (born 1978), Finnish Anglican clergyman
Vesa Mäkipää, Finnish ski-orienteer

Finnish-language surnames